Sofie Sarenbrant, (born 4 January 1978) is a Swedish author. Her books about police Emma Sköld has sold in two million copies in fourteen countries.

Biography
Sarenbrandt was born in Stockholm in 1978, at the age of two her family moved to Narebo in Östergötland. After ending school she moved to Västervik were she studied media in high school. She began her journalism career as a freelance journalist for Veckorevyn, she has since worked for Expressen, Friskispressen and Amelia.

Sarenbrant debuted as an author with the book Vecka 36 in 2010. She is perhaps best known for her book series about the police Emma Sköld who was introduced in the book Vila i frid. Sarenbrand wanted the lead figure to be a young and ambitious woman, in comparison to the stereotypical image of a police as an alcoholic and being depressed. The third book in the series Visning pågår became the best selling crime novel of 2015, and Tiggaren, the fifth part of the book series became the second best selling crime novel of 2017 in Sweden.

The book  Bakom din rygg which was published in 2017, was the first in a series of three books about three hairdressers in Östermalm. In 2019, the seventh book about Emma Sköld named Skamvrån was published.

Bibliography
Vecka 36. Malmö: Damm. 2010. Libris   
I stället för dig. Malmö: Damm. 2011. Libris   
Vila i frid. Damm förlag. 2012. Libris   
Andra andningen. Damm förlag. 2013. Libris   
Visning pågår. Damm förlag. 2014. Libris   
Avdelning 73. Massolit förlag. 2015.  
Tiggaren. Bookmark förlag. 2016.  
Bakom din rygg. Bookmark förlag. 2017.  
Syndabocken. Bookmark förlag. 2018.  
Skamvrån. Bookmark förlag. 2019.

References

External links

Living people
1978 births
21st-century Swedish writers
Writers from Stockholm